Dmitry Shapiro is an American entrepreneur. He is the founder and CEO of GoMeta, Inc., based in San Diego. GoMeta owns Koji an App Store of social mini-apps that are added to various Links In Bios. He also created the video sharing site Veoh in 2005 which was launched a few months after YouTube. Shapiro also served as the CTO at MySpace, before moving on to Google where he took up the role of Group Product Manager. Shapiro left Google in order to found GoMeta.

Education and career 
Shapiro was born in Russia but later moved to the United States. Shapiro graduated with a BS in Electrical Engineering from the Georgia Institute of Technology in 1992. From 1995-1999, Shapiro served as the Head of Web Development at Fujitsu Business Communications.

After his time at Fujitsu, Shapiro was the Director of Product and Engineering at CollegeClub.com, a social network which he helped grow from 200,000 members to over 4 million.

In 2000, Shapiro founded Akonix Systems Inc., a network security company, where he was CEO, and later CTO, and Head of Product until 2004. Akonix built a Perimeter Security Gateway that performed deep packet inspection on corporate networks, detected unauthorized network traffic, and helped IT managers manage it.

In December 2004, Shapiro founded Veoh Networks, Inc., where he was the CEO and Head of Product. Veoh became one of the largest online video websites, competing with Hulu and YouTube. The company raised over $70 million and had over 28 million monthly users before getting sued by Universal Music for copyright infringement. While Veoh won the court case and two appeals, the company was unable to sustain itself as Universal Music also sued Veoh’s investors, forcing Veoh to be sold.

After Veoh, Shapiro was CTO at Myspace Music, where he was responsible for product and engineering.

Shapiro was recruited by Google in 2012 as a Group Product Manager, working on Social Graph, Identity, Content Discovery, and API Infrastructure.

In September 2016, Shapiro co-founded GoMeta, Inc., where he serves as CEO today. GoMeta owns and operates Koji -- The App Store for Creator Economy. To date, GoMeta has received $36 million in funding and has employees in San Diego, San Francisco, New York, Fort Lauderdale, and Barcelona.

References 

Living people
Georgia Tech alumni
American technology company founders
Year of birth missing (living people)